Fatimatu Abubakar is a Ghanaian lawyer, politician and entrepreneur. She is a member of the New Patriotic Party and the current Deputy Communication Minister for the President of Ghana. Fatimatu Abubakar is the Deputy Commutation Director at the office of the  president Ghana,she also work with Lasdown Resort, Aburi,and also SRM Engineering limited serves as the house manager and clerk. Respectively, Fatimatu Abubakar studied Psychology and English for the first and the second degree.

Early life and education 
Miss Abubakar was born in Kumasi in the Ashanti Region. She graduated from the University of Ghana with a bachelor's degree in Psychology and English Language. In 2008, while she was schooling at the University of Ghana, she served as the Vice President of Akuafo Hall Junior Common Room and contested for the position of the Coordinating Secretary of  the National Union of Ghana Students (NUGS) in 2010.

Career and Political life
Deputy Minister for Information since June 2021. In January 2017 she was appointed the deputy director of Communications at the Flagstaff House by President Nana Akuffo-Addo. Prior to her appointment, she worked at Lansdown Resort, Danquah Institute and SRM Engineering.

References

Living people
People from Upper West Region
1986 births